The Oegophiurida are an order of brittle stars, class Ophiuroidea.

The physical characteristics of this order include well separated lateral plates, which expose the oral surface of radial ossicles.  It also has vertebrae with streptospondylous (hourglass) articulation, which thus allow for vertical and horizontal movements. The order has neither oral nor radial shields.  They have paired serial gonads arranged segmentally along the arm.  The hyponeural groove is covered by soft integument, which forms a spacious epineural canal that is not closed over by ventral arm plates.  The disk is covered by naked or granulated skin, or by imbricating scales.

The Oegophiurida are extinct except for a recent species, Ophiocanops fugiens, which has several remarkable features.  In each arm is a single digestive caecum.  The caecum wall has many folds which enlarge the absorbing surface.  This is similar to the structure in asteroids.  Nothing, however, is known of this species' microscopic gut structure.  Its gonads also stretch into the arms, also common to asteroids.  Both of these are hardly present in other orders of the class.  The skeleton is similar to other ophiuroids, except the paired right and left vertebrae are not fused, albeit set in orderly fashion.  Also absent are ventral arm plates and radial and oral shields.  Previously, the Oegophiurida were known only to exist from the lower Ordovician to the upper Carboniferous periods.  However, most features of O. fugiens conform to this order, such as the absence of genital plates and genital bursae.  They also lack dorsal or ventral arm plates. However, some recent studies have challenged the classification of O. fugiens as oegophiurid.

References

 
Ophiuroidea